Turnabout, known in Japan as  is a puzzle game developed by Artdink and published by Natsume for the PlayStation.

Gameplay
Turnabout consists of 70 levels. The player can only access them in groups of ten, requiring most of the levels to be completed to reach the next ten. The game's main feature is the ability to rotate the stage 90 degrees in either direction (but not 180), causing all the dynamic elements to fall in that direction. The stages are grids, being about 16x16 at maximum size. The goal is to get all the colored pieces to disappear. There are colored balls, which are dynamic, and colored blocks, which are stationary and often act as blockages. When a ball collides with another ball block of the same color, all of them disappear. This repeats until the player makes all colored pieces disappear or cannot make a move, requiring the level to be restarted.

The levels introduce a number of obstacles. Colorless blocks are dynamic pieces, which, unlike balls, are not limited to taking up only one space. Colorless blocks may have very complicated and specific shapes that make progression difficult. Colorless blocks can also not be matched, meaning they exist for the entire round. Balls and colored blocks can have five different colors (red, blue, yellow, green, purple). Each color can only match with itself, and can touch a block of a different color without disappearing.

The game includes a level editor. Players can save a certain number of levels on a memory card and play them anytime. The editor is limited to nine colorless blocks.

Reception

The game received a favorable review from Official U.S. PlayStation Magazine. In Japan, Famitsu gave it a score of 23 out of 40.

References

2000 video games
Artdink games
Natsume (company) games
PlayStation (console) games
PlayStation Network games
Puzzle video games
Single-player video games
Video games developed in Japan